The 1913 News of the World Match Play was the eleventh News of the World Match Play tournament. It was played from Tuesday 7 to Thursday 9 October at Walton Heath Golf Club. 32 players competed in a straight knock-out competition, with each match contested over 18 holes, except for the final which was over 36 holes. The winner received £100 out of a total prize fund of £400. George Duncan defeated James Braid 3 & 2 in the final to win the tournament. This was Braid's fifth final but the first time he had been beaten.

Qualification
Entry was restricted to members of the Professional Golfers' Association (PGA). Qualification was by a series of 36-hole stroke-play competitions; one for each of the eight PGA sections. The Southern section had 12 qualifiers, the Northern section 7, the Midland section 5, the Scottish, Welsh and Western sections 2 and the Eastern and Irish sections 1. Because of the large number of entries in the Southern section, two events were run with 6 qualifiers at each venue. In the event of a tie for places there was a playoff.

Harry Vardon and Ted Ray, the 1912 finalists, were in the US and did not enter.

Qualifying events:

10 July Western section at Came Down: Ernest Whitcombe won by 3 strokes on 155. Charles Whitcombe and Henry Shutt tied for second place on 158 but Whitcombe won the 9-hole playoff 45 to 46.
23 July Eastern section at Brancaster: Ernest Riseborough won by 3 strokes on 160.
 3 September Northern section at St Anne's Old Links: Sam Whiting won by 1 stroke on 147. Tom Brace, Peter Rainford and Thomas Renouf tied on 151 and played off the next day for two places. Renouf with 73 and Rainford 77 qualified, while Brace scored 80.
11 September Irish section at Royal County Down: Michael Moran won by 2 strokes on 152.
17 September Midland section at Little Aston: George Tuck won by 1 stroke on 153. The event was also the 1913 Midland Professional Championship.
17 September Southern section at Bramshot: George Duncan won by 2 strokes on 145.
17 September Southern section at Burhill: Laurie Ayton, Snr won by 2 strokes on 139.
18 September Scottish section at Carnoustie: Peter Robertson and Willie Watt tied on 151.
24 September Welsh section at Bangor: Harry Ball won by 4 strokes on 147.

The qualifiers were:

Western section: Charles Whitcombe, Ernest Whitcombe
Eastern section: Ernest Riseborough
Northern section: Bill Davies, Arthur Day, James Douglas Edgar, Peter Rainford, Thomas Renouf, Harry Simpson, Sam Whiting
Irish section: Michael Moran
Midland section: George Buckle, Harry Cawsey, George Tuck, Edward Veness, Dick Wheildon
Southern section at Bramshot Golf Club: Tom Ball, James Bradbeer, James Braid, George Duncan, Fred Leach, Willie Ritchie
Southern section at Burhill Golf Club: Laurie Ayton, Snr, James Batley, Jean Gassiat, Charles Mayo, Jack B. Ross, Reg Wilson
Scottish section: Peter Robertson, Willie Watt
Welsh section: Harry Ball, George Gadd

Sandy Herd, J.H. Taylor and James Sherlock failed to qualify from the Southern section. So the only previous winners competing were Tom Ball and James Braid.

Format
The format was unchanged. Matches were over 18 holes except for the final which was over 36 holes. Extra holes were played in the event of a tied match. Two rounds were played on the first day, two more on the second day with the final on the third day.

Results
Source:

Prize money
The winner received £100 and a gold medal, but the runner-up now received £40 and a silver medal, losing semi-finalists £20 and a bronze medal, losing quarter-finalists £15, second round losers £10 and first round losers £5.

References

Golf tournaments in England
News of the World Match Play
News of the World Match Play
October 1913 sports events